"Revenge Is a Dish Best Served Three Times" is the eleventh episode of the eighteenth season of the American animated television series The Simpsons. It originally aired on the Fox network in the United States on January 28, 2007. It was written by Joel H. Cohen, and directed by Michael Polcino.

Plot
After the Simpsons' car is cut off by the Rich Texan while driving to the airport for their Miami vacation, Homer's motivation for revenge prompts his family to tell three stories concerning vengeance, hoping to convince Homer that pursuing revenge is not a good idea.

The Count of Monte Fatso
Marge tells a cautionary tale of revenge taking place in 19th century France, parodying the 1844 novel The Count of Monte Cristo by Alexandre Dumas.

Moe breaks up the marriage of Homer and Marge by framing Homer as an English traitor. Moe marries Marge, and Homer, now in a French prison, swears revenge. His cellmate, Mr. Burns, leads him to a buried treasure. With its riches, Homer becomes the Count of Monte Cristo. Five years later, he kills Moe with a homemade machine, expecting Marge to take him back. Marge angrily rebuffs him, showing him the triplets she had with Moe.

At the end of the story, Marge's explanation is that revenge can lead to misery and sadness. However, Homer ignores her.

Revenge of the Geeks
Titled as a parody on the movie Revenge of the Nerds, Lisa's story revolves around Milhouse's campaign to fight back against the school bullies and the consequences when he goes too far.

Tired of being bullied by Jimbo, Dolph, and Kearney, the geeks plan their revenge. In the science lab, Martin creates The Getbackinator, a ray gun that makes people perform various playground tortures on themselves such as wedgies and wet willies. Milhouse uses the weapon on the bullies, but then begins attacking anyone who has ever (accidentally or on purpose) wronged him, including his own friends. Lisa eventually convinces Milhouse to stop, and he reluctantly throws the device aside. Afterwards, Nelson returns from an absence due to mumps, finds the weapon and ends up using it against Milhouse.

Lisa claims the moral of the story is that taking revenge makes a person as bad as those who hurt them. Homer is not convinced and resumes his pursuit of revenge.

Bartman Begins
Having missed their flight to Miami, Homer begins to approach the Rich Texan to enact his revenge until Bart offers to recount "Bartman's 'origin story'", a parody of the film Batman Begins.

After leaving the Opera House, Homer and Marge are killed by Snake Jailbird in a dark alley. Bart swears revenge on Snake, creating his superhero alter ego, Bartman. He is helped by his grandfather, who used to fight crime as the Crimson Cockatoo. Bartman flies around Gotham City, defeating enemies in his way for justice. When Snake attempts to steal the "Stealable Jewels of the Orient" from the Gotham Natural History Museum, Bartman arrives and kills him, using the fangs of a snake statue. Afterward, Lisa reminds Bartman that Snake's death will not bring his parents back. Bartman agrees that she has a point, but adds that he feels better since he finally had his revenge, has now "zillions of dollars" and is free from his parents' control.

During the story, Homer is seen to have made amends with the Rich Texan after hearing that they are both from Connecticut.

Before the credits roll, a dedication is shown to all the characters who died in the Star Wars films.

Critical reception
Dan Iverson of IGN gave the episode a rating of 7.7, writing "While there was some really funny material in the episode, "Revenge Is a Dish Best Served Three Times" was still under par for The Simpsons. "The Count of Monte Fatso" showed the fact that the writers can still do a silly parody well, but the other two stories were rather mediocre, relying on gags and humorous visuals to make the segments passable. The trilogy style of episodes continues to be very entertaining, and even though this particular episode wasn't astounding, we will still anticipate the next time that the show gives us parody stories with our favorite television family."

References

External links
 

The Simpsons (season 18) episodes
2007 American television episodes
Television episodes about revenge
Television shows based on The Count of Monte Cristo
Television episodes about murder
Television episodes set in France